Adolfo Constenla Umaña (born January 14, 1948 in San José, Costa Rica; died November 7, 2013) was a Costa Rican philologist and linguist who specialized in the indigenous languages of Central America. He is especially known as a leading scholar on Chibchan languages.

Education
He studied Spanish philology at the University of Costa Rica. In 1981, he graduated with a Ph.D. in Linguistics from the University of Pennsylvania with a thesis on the comparative phonology of the Chibchan languages.

Career
Since 1970, he worked as a teacher and researcher at the School of Philology, Linguistics, and Literature at the University of Costa Rica. He became Professor in 1983.

Adolfo Constenla was the founder and coordinator of the Programa de Investigaciones sobre las Lenguas de Costa Rica y Áreas Vecinas (PIL; "Research Program on the Languages of Costa Rica and Neighboring Areas"). From 1985 to 1996, he collected and analyzed linguistic data of many indigenous Central America languages.

From 1988–1989, he was a visiting professor at the State University of New York at Albany. In 1995, he became a full member of the Academia Costarricense de la Lengua.

For his work, Constenla received the Aquileo J. Echeverría National Award three times, in 1979, 1998, and 2007). In addition, he received the Carlos Gagini Award from the Costa Rican Association of Philology and Linguistics in 1984.

He died from cancer on November 7, 2013 at the age of 65.

References

1948 births
2013 deaths
Linguists of indigenous languages of the Americas
People from San José, Costa Rica